Raphael Rossi Branco (born 25 July 1990), sometimes known as Raphael or Raphael Rossi, is a Brazilian professional footballer who plays as a centre-back for Polish club Radomiak Radom.

He began his career with Porto Alegre and moved to Europe in 2011 to join Brighton & Hove Albion, and then nearby Whitehawk, where he won the 2012–13 Isthmian League. He then signed for Swindon Town, playing 131 official matches and scoring seven goals for the League One club before joining Boavista in 2017 and Sion a year later.

Club career

Early career
Born in Campinas, São Paulo, Rossi debuted professionally for Porto Alegre and was spotted by an agent who was friend of Gus Poyet, then Brighton & Hove Albion manager. He went on a trial for the English club and an offer to sign for the team was stalled until the player could get an Italian passport. After that, Brighton demanded a statement from Branco's former youth clubs in which they would not receive future compensation, otherwise the club would have to pay £200,000 to register him, which meant he would be released.

After unsuccessful trials in Europe and Brazil, he went to play again in England for Brighton-based club Whitehawk. Since he was signing for a non-professional club, he did not need any agreement with his former clubs and could move to other clubs for free. With Whitehawk, Rossi won the 2012–13 Isthmian League.

Swindon Town
On 2 August 2013, he joined Swindon Town on a one year-deal after impressing on a pre-season trip to Portugal after being invited by a former Brighton & Hove Albion assistant. He was first called up for a matchday squad on 31 August, remaining unused as Swindon won 5–0 at the County Ground in a League One game against Crewe Alexandra. He made his debut on 8 October in the second round of the Football League Trophy, playing the entirety of a 2–1 victory over League Two team Plymouth Argyle. On 29 December he made his first league appearance, replacing the injured Grant Hall in the 53rd minute of a 1–1 draw away to Bradford City. He was given his first league start on 14 January 2014, playing the full 90 minutes of a 0–2 loss away to Stevenage. In total he played 18 matches over his first season, 15 of which were in the league.

He signed a new one-year contract on 30 June 2014. On 30 August, he scored the first goal of his professional career, heading from Nathan Byrne's cross to equalise in a 1–1 home league draw against Coventry City. In December, having previously been told that he had played his last game, he signed a further contract. Rossi scored again on 7 February 2015, opening the scoring from John Swift's pass in a 2–0 home win over Barnsley which put Swindon into second place in League One. He scored the only goal on 14 March to win away at Port Vale, heading in Harry Toffolo's corner in the eighth minute. Rossi was an unused substitute on 24 May as Swindon lost 0–4 to Preston North End in the play-off final at Wembley Stadium.

Swindon were relegated in Rossi's final season, 2016–17. On 8 October 2016, he was sent off for elbowing Lawrie Wilson in a 1–0 home loss to Bolton Wanderers.

Boavista
On 16 June 2017, Rossi signed a two-year deal with Primeira Liga club Boavista. He made his debut on 20 August in a 1–0 loss at Marítimo, and scored his first goal for them a week later, the game's only in a home victory against Aves.

FC Sion

In June 2018, Rossi signed a three-year deal with Swiss club FC Sion.

Loan to Radomiak Radom 
On 1 February 2021, Rossi moved to I liga club Radomiak Radom, on a loan deal until the end of the season.

Radomiak Radom 

In July 2021, Rossi signed a permanent contract with Radomiak Radom having completed a successful loan spell.

Playing style
In addition to central defence, Rossi can play at right-back and midfield. His favourite player is compatriot defender David Luiz.

Personal life
His older brother Igor, also a defender, plays for Al-Faisaly in the Saudi Professional League.

Career statistics

Club

Honours
Whitehawk

 Isthmian League: 2012–13
Radomiak Radom
I liga: 2020–21

References

External links
Profile at the official Ekstraklasa website

1990 births
Living people
Brazilian people of Italian descent
Sportspeople from Campinas
Brazilian footballers
Brazilian expatriate footballers
Association football defenders
Porto Alegre Futebol Clube players
Brighton & Hove Albion F.C. players
Whitehawk F.C. players
Swindon Town F.C. players
Boavista F.C. players
FC Sion players
Radomiak Radom players
Isthmian League players
English Football League players
Primeira Liga players
Swiss Super League players
Ekstraklasa players
I liga players
Expatriate footballers in England
Expatriate footballers in Portugal
Expatriate footballers in Switzerland
Expatriate footballers in Poland
Brazilian expatriate sportspeople in England
Brazilian expatriate sportspeople in Poland
Brazilian expatriate sportspeople in Portugal